Pennask Lake Provincial Park is a provincial park in British Columbia, Canada, located on the easternmost heights of the Thompson Plateau, to the northwest of the Okanagan town of Peachland.

Pennask Lake is a high elevation lake that has multiple spring creeks flowing into it. The park takes in two bays at the southeast corner of Pennask Lake. Peterson Bay is a long, narrow bay which provides entry into the main portion of the lake from the park. Chapman Bay is a shallow, confined bay at the north end of the park. The park fronts one kilometre of the lake's south shore.

References

Provincial parks of British Columbia
Nicola Country
Provincial parks in the Okanagan
1974 establishments in British Columbia
Protected areas established in 1974